Schultheis is a surname. Notable people with the surname include:
David Schultheis
Herman Schultheis
Jean Schultheis
Katrin Schultheis and Sandra Sprinkmeier
Michael Schultheis
Olivier Schultheis
Rob Schultheis

See also